The Red River Bridge War was a boundary conflict between the U.S. states of Oklahoma and Texas over an existing toll bridge and a new free bridge crossing the Red River.

The Red River Bridge Company, a private firm owned by Benjamin Colbert, had been operating a toll bridge that carried U.S. Route 69 and U.S. Route 75 between Colbert, Oklahoma, and Denison, Texas. In 1931, Texas and Oklahoma jointly built a new, free span northwest of the existing toll bridge. 

On July 10, 1931, the Red River Bridge Company obtained an injunction against the Texas Highway Commission (now Texas Department of Transportation), keeping it from opening the new bridge. The company said that the highway commission had promised in July 1930 to buy the old toll bridge for $60,000 (equal to $ today). In reaction to the injunction, the Governor of Texas, Ross S. Sterling, ordered that the new free bridge be barricaded at the Texas end.

On July 17, Oklahoma Governor "Alfalfa Bill" Murray ordered the new bridge open, by executive order. Murray issued this order on the grounds that the land on both sides of the river belonged to Oklahoma, per the Adams–Onís Treaty of 1819. Murray sent highway crews across the new bridge to destroy the barricades.

Governor Sterling sent Adjutant General William Warren Sterling and three Texas Rangers to the new bridge to defend the Texas Highway Commission workers enforcing the injunction, and rebuilt the barricade that night. The next day, Oklahoma crews under Governor Murray's order demolished the Oklahoma approach to the toll bridge, rendering that bridge impassable.

The Texas State Legislature called a special session on July 23 to pass a bill allowing the Red River Bridge Company to sue the state over the issue, partially in response to meetings in Sherman and Denison, Texas, demanding the free bridge be opened. The next day, Governor Murray declared martial law at the site, enforced by Oklahoma National Guardsmen, and personally appeared at the site, armed with a revolver, hours before a Muskogee, Oklahoma, court issued an injunction prohibiting him from blocking the northern toll bridge approach. Murray directed the guardsmen to allow anyone to cross either bridge.

Murray discovered on July 27 that the free bridge was in danger of being closed permanently. He expanded the martial-law zone across the river, stationing guardsmen on both free bridge approaches. The injunction against the bridge opening was dissolved and the martial law order rescinded on August 6.

News of the dispute made national and international headlines. Adolf Hitler may have believed that the events were evidence of in-fighting between the American states, weakening the union.

The free bridge that was the cause of the dispute was opened on Labor Day, September 7, 1931. It was replaced in 1995, though a portion of the bridge was saved as a historical attraction and relocated to a park in Colbert, Oklahoma.

References

Further reading
 Rusty Williams, The Red River Bridge War: A Texas-Oklahoma Border Battle (Texas A&M University Press, 2016).

External links
Red River Bridge Controversy – Handbook of Texas Online
Texas Day by Day – July 13, 1931
 Toll Bridge coordinates: 
 Oklahoma Digital Maps: Digital Collections of Oklahoma and Indian Territory

History of Oklahoma
Battles and conflicts without fatalities
History of Texas
Internal territorial disputes of the United States
Internal wars of the United States
Bridges in Oklahoma
Bridges in Texas
1931 in Oklahoma
1931 in Texas
Former toll bridges in Oklahoma
Former toll bridges in Texas
Red River of the South
Borders of Oklahoma
Borders of Texas
Toll (fee)
Transport controversies